Robert Morris Walzel (born September 26, 1949) is an American professional golfer.

Walzel was born in Houston, Texas. He played college golf at the University of Houston where he was on the teams that won back-to-back NCAA Division I Championships in 1969 and 1970. He turned professional in 1973.

Walzel played on the PGA Tour from 1974 to 1981. His best finishes were two third places in 1977: at the Bob Hope Chrysler Classic and at the Tallahassee Open. He did win the 1979 Magnolia State Classic, a PGA Tour-sponsored "satellite" event played opposite the Masters Tournament. His best finish in a major was a T-8 at the 1980 PGA Championship.

Walzel played on the Champions Tour from 2001 to 2004. His best finish was a T-2 at 2001 Verizon Classic.

Professional wins
1977 Texas State Open
1979 Magnolia State Classic

Results in major championships

Note: Walzel never played in The Open Championship.

CUT = missed the half-way cut
"T" indicates a tie for a place

See also 

 1973 PGA Tour Qualifying School graduates

References

External links

American male golfers
Houston Cougars men's golfers
PGA Tour golfers
PGA Tour Champions golfers
Golfers from Houston
1949 births
Living people